The 2005 Belgian Grand Prix (officially the 2005 Formula 1 Belgian Grand Prix) was a Formula One motor race held on 11 September 2005 at Circuit de Spa-Francorchamps near the village of Francorchamps, Wallonia, Belgium. It was the sixteenth race of the 2005 FIA Formula One World Championship and the 62nd Belgian Grand Prix.

The 44-lap race was won by Finnish driver Kimi Räikkönen, driving a McLaren-Mercedes, after he started from second position. Räikkönen's Colombian teammate, Juan Pablo Montoya, took pole position and led until his second pit stop on lap 33; he then maintained second place until a late collision with Brazilian driver Antônio Pizzonia in the Williams-BMW. Spaniard Fernando Alonso thus took second in his Renault, with Englishman Jenson Button third in a BAR-Honda.

With three races remaining, Alonso led the Drivers' Championship by 25 points from Räikkönen, needing only six more to clinch the title. In the Constructors' Championship, McLaren reduced Renault's lead to six points.

Friday drivers 
The bottom 6 teams in the 2004 Constructors' Championship were entitled to run a third car in free practice on Friday. These drivers drove on Friday but did not compete in qualifying or the race.

Report

Background
Before the race, Renault were leading the Constructors' Championship with 144 points and McLaren were second with 136 points, with Ferrari third on 58 points. In the World Drivers' Championship, Renault driver Fernando Alonso was leading with 103 points; Kimi Räikkönen was second on 76 points, 27 points behind Alonso. Behind Alonso and Räikkönen in the Drivers' Championship, Michael Schumacher was third on 55 points in a Ferrari, with Juan Pablo Montoya and Jarno Trulli on 50 and 43 points respectively.

Practice and qualifying
Four practice sessions were held before the Sunday race—two on Friday from 11:00 to 12:00 and 14:00 to 15:00 local time, with the final two sessions held on Saturday morning between 09:00 to 09:45 and 10:15 to 11:00.

Saturday's afternoon qualifying session took place as a one-lap session held between 13:00 and 14:00. Drivers went out one at a time in the reverse order of their finishing positions at the previous race. The cars ran on the fuel that would be used for the Sunday race.

Giancarlo Fisichella started the race from 13th place – the result of a ten-place grid penalty given for an engine change between final practice and qualifying on the Saturday.

Race

The race took place in the afternoon from 14:00 local time. On lap 11 Fisichella had an accident at Eau Rouge, emerging unhurt from his wrecked Renault but this brought out the safety car. On lap 14, Takuma Sato hit Michael Schumacher's car from behind, causing both to retire. Antônio Pizzonia crashed into Juan Pablo Montoya—in second position at the time—shortly before the finish of the race. Jacques Villeneuve was able to finish sixth by virtue of a one-stop pit strategy, while other drivers stopped as many as five times.

This race saw the Jordan team score their final point, courtesy of Tiago Monteiro, while the BAR team achieved their last podium finish through Jenson Button. Also, Ralf Schumacher scored his last, and Toyota's first, fastest lap.

Post-race
The race stewards ruled that Sato had caused the collision with Schumacher, and he would consequently drop ten places on the grid for the next Grand Prix in Brazil. They also fined Pizzonia $8,000 for his collision with Montoya.

Unusually, McLaren did not send a representative to the podium to collect the constructors' trophy, so, Räikkönen accepted it on behalf of the team.

Classification

Qualifying

Race

 Doornbos and Albers started the race from the pitlane.

Championship standings after the race 
Bold text indicates who still has a theoretical chance of becoming World Champion.

Drivers' Championship standings

Constructors' Championship standings

See also 
 2005 Spa-Francorchamps GP2 Series round

References

Belgian Grand Prix
Grand Prix
Belgian Grand Prix
September 2005 sports events in Europe